= Deepak Loomba =

Indian businessman (born 1971)

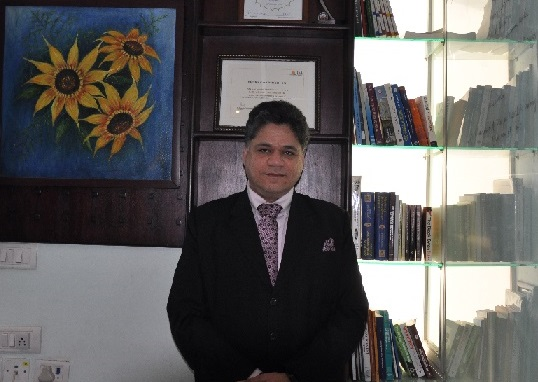
- Deepak Loomba at his office
- Born: 7 March 1971 (age 55); Ludhiana in India
- Education: Moscow State University
- Occupation: Chairman of De Core Group
- Spouse: Harsh Inder Loomba

Deepak Loomba is an Indian businessman.

== Education ==
Deepak followed his schooling in Birla Higher Secondary School Pilani (Rajasthan) with higher studies in Physics and Mathematics in Moscow State University. Deepak, a technopreneur has a number of Intellectual Property Rights (IPR) to his credit. Contributions are in the field of lighting, semiconductors and material processing.

== Early career ==
A serial technopreneur, Deepak started his business career in Moscow, Russia in the early 1990s. The businesses that he/his Companies have been involved included international trading in agro products, chemicals and fertilizers as also metallurgical manufacturing. His first Co. Wazir Inc. in which he sold out his interest, was producing shredded copper from copper scrap and CC Rods for cable industry. Technology developed by Deepak in conjunction with co-authors was world's first to use vortex grinding for grinding shredded copper into copper powder, without taking the copper cathode smelting and water sprinkling route leading to a major breakthrough for production of non-electronic grade copper powder (mainly for paint industry). The company is also a major exporter of wires and cables from Russia.

Through 1996–1997, besides establishing businesses in CIS nations, Deepak also established business for agro imports in Hamburg (Germany) and trading of Chemicals in Basel (Switzerland).

In a complete departure from technology-intensive sector, he set up Resotel Ltd., which was seeded from scratch to become the first integrated supplier of edibles to the hospitality industry in Moscow, before being sold to a local Russian Co.

== Return to India ==
On returning to India, he promoted Transtechnology Consultants, a partnership firm along with Dr. S. K. Agarwal, a physicist, who worked for Solid State Physics Laboratories in Delhi, for providing consultancy services in the field of vacuum technologies, while he worked towards the financial closure of De Core Science & Technologies Ltd., a Company founded by Deepak to establish State-of-the-Art compound semiconductor plant in India. Through its short operation, Transtechnology Consultants executed technology consultancy contracts including one to upgrade and improve an existing Compact Fluorescent assembly line and developed a special Hg-Zn amalgam to replace liquid mercury dosing in gas-discharge lamps leading to substantial reduction in use of mercury.

He co-developed technology for manufacturing of photovoltaic vacuum glass panel for windows. He owns intellectual property in the area of material processing and die architecture of light emitting diodes.

== Current occupations ==
Presently, Loomba is the Chairman and Managing Director of De Core Group which includes De Core Nanosemiconductors Limited Gandhinagar as well as De Core Science & Technologies Ltd., Noida. Both the Companies are public limited companies.

De Core Nanosemiconductors Limited is South Asia's first compound Nanosemiconductor Fab., producing Light Emitting Diodes, and scheduled to manufacture nextgen mobile telephony components in Gandhinagar, Gujarat (India).

Deepak has published three scientific papers in prestigious global conferences in the area of material science. He has also authored a pivotal work in the area of planetary science which is available on his blog:

Under Deepak, De Core Science & Technologies Ltd as well as De Core nanosemiconductors Ltd. have filed more than 34 IPRs in various fields of design, optics, optoelectronics, engineering. Of these more than 24 IPR are contributed by Deepak Loomba. Further details on all the papers, publications and IPR owned by Deepak Loomba, completely or partially are mentioned in the linkedin profile.

Deepak, has authored multiple books, all of which are available on http://www.deepakloomba.in/books

The first publication is titled Transformers ISBN 978-1514861240. The book is about the establishment of India's first Commercial Compound Semiconductor Fab along with creation of Transformational Systems that enabled creation of an innovation assembly line.

Преобразователи (Preobrazovateli) ISBN 978-5-4485-2542-1 is the first original work on Innovation produced by an Indian Author, in Russian.

Invention of Description ISBN 978-1548181130 is a short book spanning 34 pages, and is an original and pioneering work on a new methodology invented by the author to describe the quality and the goods, services or works themselves.

== Family ==
Deepak Loomba married Harsh Inder Loomba, a Visual Artist and has a son named Mehul Loomba.
